Walter Newton Justis (August 17, 1883 – October 4, 1941), nicknamed "Smoke", was a Major League Baseball pitcher who played in  with the Detroit Tigers. He batted and threw right-handed. Justis had a 0–0 record, with an 8.10 ERA, in 2 games, in his one-year career.

He spent several years playing professional ball in various minor leagues. In 1908, he set a still-standing minor league record by pitching four no-hitters for the Lancaster Lanks. In 1913, his last season, he famously threw a shutout to win the home opener for the premiere season of the Covington Blue Sox at Federal Park (two blocks from where a sports bar now carries his namesake).

He was born in Moores Hill, Indiana, and died in Greendale, Indiana.

References

External links

1883 births
1941 deaths
Major League Baseball pitchers
Baseball players from Indiana
Detroit Tigers players
Kansas City Blues (baseball) players
Macon Brigands players
Lancaster Lanks players
Dayton Veterans players
Jersey City Skeeters players
Holyoke Papermakers players
Kansas City Packers players
Covington Blue Sox players
People from Dearborn County, Indiana